Corbistoma is a proposed clade within the Cryptista which includes the Picobiliphytes and Telonemidae.

References

Cryptista